Thrypti is a mountain range in Lasithi in eastern Crete, Greece. It trends to the northeast from Ierapetra in the southwest in the direction of Sitia. However, it only goes half-way in that direction. The rest of the distance is completed by the distinct Ornon mountains, separated from the Thrypti by the Bebonas river valley, and the lower Western Siteia Foothills covering the space between the Ornon range and Sitia itself. The highest peak of Thrypti is Afentis, which is 1,476 m amsl. The three ranges constitute the West Sitia Mountains.

Geography 
The Thrypti mountains are virtually 100% under the municipality of Ierapetra in Lasithi regional unit. The NE border of Ierapetra is so irregular that some small pockets of Thrypti might inadvertently be in neighboring Siteia municipality. Certainly the Sitia Mountains include ranges from both municipalities.

The Thripti mountains run diagonally SW from the southern coast at the city of Ierapetra (where they are not much in evidence) to the border of Sitia at Mirabello Bay, which is another reason why they alone are not the Sitia mountains. They are not even in Sitia. The Bebonas valley cannot serve as a border near the coast, as it only descends from its origin in the pre-existing mountains.

The mountains are a massif, seen from outside the massif as a wall of mountains. On top the massif are the montane slopes and plateaus of low enough inclination to support pastures, some agriculture or dendriculture, and villages. It is too dry at those altitudes for much greenery; a bare rocky slope is the norm. The canyons, or gorges, are cut deeply into the edges of the massif by runoff from above, a process facilitated by the softness and solubility of limestone. Caves and deep cuts abound.

West side

One method of defining the borders of the Thripti massif is to follow the wall around its periphery. The terrain offers a good starting point in Vainia, a settlement of Ierapetra to its NE. This landmark comes the closest of any to being the SW corner of the massif. It looks over flat farmland divided into plots all the way to the city. Above it looms Skouros peak, and above that (} Katalymata peak, .

Heading north on Route 20 (ΕΠ 20) at the foot of the massif one arrives at Plakoura, where Route 20A branches to the east toward Ha Gorge; otherwise, Route 20 does not approach it. The gorge is at the bottom of a valley flanked by Koufota, to the south and Papoura, to the north. Springs in Thrypti feed a stream that plunges into the chasm at Mastoras waterfall.

Route 20 meanwhile merges into the coastal Route 90, which heading NE arrives at Kavousi, a city at the mouth of a larger valley dividing west Papouras from Kapsos, max elevation , to the north. The valley, called Havgas Gorge, is caused by the Kavousi river, which drains westward from the slopes of Spathi,  near Melisses, exits the massif at Kavousi, turns northward, and reaches Mirabello Bay at Tholos. Waters come from many tributaries within the gorge, which is extensive, including Mesona Gorge, which conducts water from the slopes of Afentis northward to intersect Havgas Gorge. As one might suspect, the terrain of Havgas permits a single winding road, characterized by numerous hairpin turns, to pass through it on the slopes above the river, going over the pass at its source to Bebonas. The pass is east of Melisses. It goes between Spathi and Kleros, elevation , and serves as a source for the Bebonas River. It flows eastward, defining the border between Thripti and the Ornon Mountains.

North side
One might expect that all the peaks north of the Kabousi-Bebonas line would be the Ornon range, but this is not the case. Geographically, it forms the NW corner of the massif. Other sources count it as part of the Ornon range. The answer to the mystery is geopolitical.

Route 90A encloses the north of Kapsos forming a big bend from Kavousi on the west to Lastros on the east, located near the source of a S-N draining valley with Kapsos on its left and Tsigouni Gorge on its right. The border between Demos Ierapetras and Demos Siteias, however, proceeding N-S from the bay, cutting 90A, runs along the west side of the Kapsos ridge; i.e., it divides the mountain. South of Lastos it veers east to cut Spathi similarly on its upper north flank and also cuts the mountains on the north flank of the Bebonas Valley. This border is the traditional line of demarcation for the two ranges; i.e., half of Kapsos is Thrypti, and the other half Ornon, etc.

See also
 Ha Gorge
 Mesona Gorge
 Milona Gorge
 Orino Gorge

Notes

Citations

External links

Mountains of Crete
Mountain ranges of Greece
Landforms of Lasithi